Glen Austin is a suburb of Johannesburg, South Africa. It is located in Region 2 and Region 7. It is a suburb of Midrand, situated about half way between Johannesburg and Pretoria. The stands within Glen Austin are all classed as Agricultural Holdings, with none being smaller than 8500 square meters.

History
In the 19th century a Voortrekker named Daniel Erasmus pegged out the area known today as Midrand as his land. On his death, Daniel's granddaughter, Anne Erasmus, as part of her inheritance, was willed land which included the Glen Austin area. In 1920 Anne married Mr Eustace Gain Austin and from that union came the name Glen Austin.

References

External links 
  Glen Austin Residents Association website

Johannesburg Region A